Luca Andrea Cardelli  is an Italian computer scientist who is a research professor at the University of Oxford, UK. Cardelli is well known for his research in type theory and operational semantics. Among other contributions, in programming languages, he helped design the language Modula-3, implemented the first compiler for the (non-pure) functional language ML, defined the concept of typeful programming, and helped develop the experimental language Polyphonic C#.

Education
He was born in Montecatini Terme, Italy. He attended the University of Pisa before receiving his PhD from the University of Edinburgh in 1982 for research supervised by Gordon Plotkin.

Career and research
Before joining the University of Oxford in 2014, and Microsoft Research in Cambridge, UK in 1997, he worked for Bell Labs and Digital Equipment Corporation, and contributed to Unix software including vismon.

Awards and honours
In 2004 he was inducted as a Fellow of the Association for Computing Machinery. He was elected a Fellow of the Royal Society (FRS) in 2005. In 2007, Cardelli was awarded the Senior AITO Dahl–Nygaard Prize named for Ole-Johan Dahl and Kristen Nygaard.

References

Alumni of the University of Edinburgh
Italian computer scientists
Year of birth missing (living people)
Living people
Fellows of the Association for Computing Machinery
Programming language researchers
Fellows of the Royal Society
DNA nanotechnology people

Dahl–Nygaard Prize